The Texas Math and Science Coaches Association or TMSCA is an organization for coaches of academic University Interscholastic League teams in Texas middle schools and high schools, specifically those that compete in mathematics and science-related tests.

Events 

There are four events in the TMSCA at both the middle and high school level: Number Sense, General Mathematics, Calculator Applications, and General Science.

Number Sense is an 80-question exam that students are given only 10 minutes to solve. Additionally, no scratch work or paper calculations are allowed. These questions range from simple calculations such as 99+98 to more complicated operations such as 1001×1938. Each calculation is able to be done with a certain trick or shortcut that makes the calculations easier.
The high school exam includes calculus and other difficult topics in the questions also with the same rules applied as to the middle school version.
It is well known that the grading for this event is particularly stringent as errors such as writing over a line or crossing out potential answers are considered as incorrect answers.

General Mathematics is a 50-question exam that students are given only 40 minutes to solve. These problems are usually more challenging than questions on the Number Sense test, and the General Mathematics word problems take more thinking to figure out. Every problem correct is worth 5 points, and for every problem incorrect, 2 points are deducted. Tiebreakers are determined by the person that misses the first problem and by percent accuracy.

Calculator Applications is an 80-question exam that students are given only 30 minutes to solve. This test requires practice on the calculator, knowledge of a few crucial formulas, and much speed and intensity. Memorizing formulas, tips, and tricks will not be enough. In this event, plenty of practice is necessary in order to master the locations of the keys and develop the speed necessary. All correct questions are worth 5 points and all incorrect questions or skipped questions that are before the last answered questions will lose 4 points; answers are to be given with three significant figures.

Science is a 50-question exam that is solved in 40 minutes at the middle school level or a 60-question exam that is solved in a 2-hour time limit at the high school level. Tiebreakers are determined by the person that misses the first problem and by percent accuracy. As the name suggests, the test focuses on the science subjects learned in the middle school or high school level depending on the student's grade and the version of the test being taken.

Competitions 
Individual schools that are members of TMSCA can host invitational competitions using TMSCA-released tests.  Many schools use this as a fund-raising opportunity for their competitive math program.

TMSCA also hosts two statewide competitions for member schools each year, one at the middle school level and one at the high school level, as well as a qualification competition at the middle school level prior to the state competition, also known as the Regional Qualifier.  These statewide competitions are held at the University of Texas at San Antonio campus each spring.  These competitions can often serve as practice for statewide UIL tournaments, which occur shortly after, and for middle school students are their only opportunity to compete at the state level (UIL competitions at the middle school level do not go beyond district). At the statewide competition, students have the opportunity to win scholarships based on their performance at the meet.

Grading 
For the General Mathematics and General Science contests in middle school, 5 points are awarded for each correct answer and 2 points are deducted for each incorrect answer. In the high school contest, 6 points are awarded for each correct answer and 2 points are deducted for each incorrect answer. The real way to calculate the score is to multiply the number of questions you attempted by 5 and subtract 7 for each incorrect question. Unanswered questions do not affect the score.  Thus, competitors are penalized for guessing incorrectly. (For both General Mathematics and General Science a perfect score is a 250.) 

On the Number Sense test, scoring is 5 times the last question answered (a student answering 32 questions would be awarded 160 points) and after that 9 points are deducted for incorrect answers, problems skipped up to the last attempted question and markovers/erasures, (so if the student above missed one and skipped three questions the student would end up with 124 points).  Number sense tests are also checked for possible scratch work, overwrites, and erasures (bluntly called "markovers"), which if found could result in questions being counted as incorrect or tests being disqualified. (For both Number Sense and Calculator, a perfect score is a 400.)

The Calculator Applications test multiplies 5 times the last question answered and deducts 9 points for incorrect or skipped questions, similar to Number Sense, but scratch work, markovers/erasures, and the use of a calculator is allowed.

Results 
At almost all TMSCA competitions, students are ranked against each other in their specific grade level. For example, all eighth graders compete against each other, all seventh graders compete against each other, and so on and so forth. This ensures parity of competition since students in higher grades generally tend to score higher than students in the lower grades. Particularly at the high school level, there is a stark contrast between freshmen with little real math and science experience and seniors, who presumably have taken or are taking advanced placement science courses and calculus.

References

External links 
 

Mathematics competitions
Organizations based in Texas
Education in Texas